WMRW-LP (94.5 FM) is a radio station broadcasting a variety music format. Licensed to Warren, Vermont, United States, the station is owned by Rootswork Inc. It is a community radio station. There are 53 volunteers on the staff.

See also
List of community radio stations in the United States

References

External links
 
 

MRW-LP
MRW-LP
Warren, Vermont
Radio stations established in 2005
2005 establishments in Vermont
Community radio stations in the United States